Stephen James "Steve" Mackall (born December 9, 1959) is a Canadian-American voice actor, voice-over announcer, comedian, director, screenwriter and songwriter. He was known as the voice of NBC's Must See TV, and performed  voice of the lead character of Marsupilami in both the Disney animated television series Raw Toonage (1992) and Marsupilami (1993).

Background
Mackall graduated from Padua Franciscan High School and Ohio University.  After having won a trip to Los Angeles as first prize in a 1986 HBO comedy contest in Washington D.C., he decided to leave Washington and live in Los Angeles, working as a copywriter while pursuing his comedy career.  He began doing voice-over work in commercials in 1989.  Representative samples of his commercial work include being the voice of the cereal box for General Mills' 1993 Fingos promotion campaign, and products and companies including CompUSA and Froot Loops, as well as being voice-over announcer for NBC, The WB, and Fox Kids Network.

He is also recognized as the voice of Hyperman in the Adventures of Hyperman CD-ROM game released in 1995 which was followed by the Hyperion Animation/CBS Television Series, The Adventures of Hyperman, that aired from November 4, 1995 to August 10, 1996.

Filmography

Television voice
 Raw Toonage (12 episodes, 1992) as Marsupilami
 The Pink Panther (2 episodes, 1993) as Johnny Chucklehead
 Marsupilami (13 episodes, 1993) as Marsupilami
 Duckman: Private Dick/Family Man (1 episode, 1994) 
 The Shnookums and Meat Funny Cartoon Show (1 episode, 1995) as Husband
 The Adventures of Hyperman (1995) as Hyperman
 Quack Pack (1 episode, 1996) 
 Mighty Ducks (26 episodes, 1996-1997) as Nosedive Flashblade
 Timon & Pumbaa (4 episodes, 1995-1999) as Happy Dog
 Digimon: Digital Monsters (1 episode, 2001) as Fox Kids' Digimon Announcer
 Totally Spies! (1 episode, 2001) as Macker, the Safecracker
 Mon Colle Knights " (2001) a Fox Kids' Mon Colle Knights Announcer

Film voice
 All Dogs Go to Heaven 2 (1996) as Short Customs Dog
 Mighty Ducks the Movie: The First Face-Off (1997) as Nosedive 
 Annabelle's Wish (1997) as Owliver 
 The Secret of NIMH 2: Timmy to the Rescue (1998) as Dr. Valentine
 Dead Man on Campus (1998) as TV Show Host (live acting)
 Disaster! (2006) as V.D. Johnson / Astronomer

Screenwriter
 Avenging Angelo (2002)
 Stealing Cars (2015)

Theater
 Wherever I Go, There we Are
 The LAF Supper

Recognition
Los Angeles Times writes that "Mackall is one of a small group of Hollywood artists who have achieved a faceless fame..." "probably best known as the voice of NBC's Must See TV", and Cleveland Plain Dealer wrote that he was "valued as an artist who can improvise voices for anything from animals to inanimate objects."

Of Mackall's one man show, Wherever I Go, There we Are. LA Weekly wrote that his "wealth of experience as a voiceover artist and comedy scribe manifests itself in his artfully layered, near flawlessly timed and often funny solo act." They noted that his personal enthusiasm connected with the audience in a manner that reminded of Will Rogers.  In their review, Backstage West wrote that when recounting the nine stories which made up his performance, "Mackall is a strong performer" whose "speaking ability commands the attention and carries the audience through captivating and well-detailed portraits of near-otherworldly scapes."

References

External links
 

1959 births
Living people
Canadian male voice actors
Male actors from Toronto
Male actors from Los Angeles
American male voice actors
20th-century American male actors
20th-century Canadian male actors
21st-century American male actors
21st-century Canadian male actors
American male video game actors
Canadian male video game actors
American male stage actors
Canadian male stage actors
American casting directors
Canadian casting directors
Canadian expatriate male actors in the United States
American voice directors
Canadian voice directors
American television writers
Canadian television writers
American male television writers
Writers from Toronto
American impressionists (entertainers)
Canadian impressionists (entertainers)
Walt Disney Animation Studios people